Sidi, also known as Habsi (Abyssinian), is an extinct Bantu language of Pakistan and India, descended from Swahili. It was reported to still being spoken in the mid 20th century in Kathiawar, Gujarat, by the Siddi.

References

Languages of Pakistan
Languages of Sindh
Languages of India
Swahili language
Languages of the African diaspora